Khoisan is a catch-all term for the "non-Bantu" indigenous peoples of Southern Africa.

Khoisan may also refer to:
 Khoisan mythology
 Khoisan languages, a group of distinct African languages that use click consonants and do not belong to other African language families
 Khoisan X (Benny Alexander; 1955–2010), South African political activist

Language and nationality disambiguation pages